Interstate 91 (I-91) is an Interstate Highway in the New England region of the United States. It provides the primary north–south thoroughfare in the western part of the region. The Interstate generally follows the course of the Connecticut River. Its southern terminus is in New Haven, Connecticut, at I-95. The northern terminus is in the village of Derby Line, Vermont, at the Canadian border. Past the Derby Line–Rock Island Border Crossing, the road continues as Quebec Autoroute 55. I-91 is the longest of three Interstate highways whose entire route is located within the New England states (the other two highways being I-89 and I-93) and is also the only primary (two-digit) Interstate Highway in New England to intersect all five of the other highways that run through the region. The largest cities along its route are New Haven, Connecticut; Hartford, Connecticut; Springfield, Massachusetts; Northampton, Massachusetts; Greenfield, Massachusetts; Brattleboro, Vermont; White River Junction, Vermont; and St. Johnsbury, Vermont, in order from south to north.

Route description 

|-
|
|
|-
|
|
|-
|
|
|-
|Total
|
|}
I-91 parallels US Route 5 (US 5) for all of its length, and many of the exits along I-91 provide direct or indirect access to the older route. Much of the route of I-91 follows the Connecticut River, traveling from Hartford, Connecticut, northward to St. Johnsbury, Vermont.

Connecticut 
I-91 is the major north–south transportation corridor for the center of the state. It is the main route between the larger cities of New Haven, Hartford, and Springfield, Massachusetts. As such, it is almost always heavily trafficked (especially during rush hour) and maintains at least three lanes in each direction through Connecticut except for a short portion in Hartford at the interchange with I-84, and another in Meriden at the interchange with Route 15. The three cities also serve as Connecticut's control points along its length of the Interstate.

I-91 begins just east of Downtown New Haven at an interchange with I-95 (Connecticut Turnpike) and Route 34. At the bottom of the ramp for exit 5, US 5 begins at the first of its many interchanges with the freeway. Leaving New Haven, I-91 follows a northeastward trek into North Haven, where it meets the southern end of the Route 40 expressway. It travels through the eastern part of Wallingford before entering the eastern part of the city of Meriden. In Meriden, about halfway between Hartford and New Haven, I-91 sees a complex set of interchanges with the Wilbur Cross Parkway (Route 15), the Route 66 expressway, and its first spur route, I-691. I-691 provides a westward link to I-84 and the city of Waterbury. Leaving Meriden, I-91 enters Middlesex County as it briefly travels through the western part of Middletown before entering Cromwell, where it has an interchange with the Route 9 expressway.

It then enters Hartford County in the town of Rocky Hill and then enters Wethersfield, meeting the southern end of the Route 3 expressway, which leads to Glastonbury and the Route 2 expressway via the William H. Putnam Memorial Bridge over the Connecticut River. I-91 then enters the Hartford city limits; in that city, it has a set of interchanges with US 5/Route 15 (Wilbur Cross Highway), which provides access from I-91 north to I-84 east, and from I-84 west to I-91 south via the Charter Oak Bridge. I-91 then has an interchange with I-84, where all other transitions to and from I-84 take place. Before leaving the city limits, a high-occupancy vehicle lane begins that has its own set of interchanges up to exit 38.

I-91 then enters Windsor and meets the western end of its other Connecticut spur route, I-291. At the Windsor–Windsor Locks town line, it meets the eastern terminus of the Route 20 expressway, which provides direct access to Bradley International Airport. A couple of miles further north, I-91 crosses the Connecticut River on the Dexter Coffin Bridge into East Windsor. After traveling through East Windsor and Enfield, it crosses the state line, at milepost 58, into Longmeadow, Massachusetts.

Massachusetts 
I-91 extends  through the Pioneer Valley of western Massachusetts paralleling the Connecticut River. I-91 serves as the major transportation corridor through three Massachusetts counties, linking the cities of Springfield, Northampton, and Greenfield. These three cities serve as the control cities listed on guide and mileage signs, along with Brattleboro, Vermont, beginning with the first northbound conventional mileage sign in Longmeadow.

In Springfield, I-91 has an interchange with I-291 at exit 6 (old exit 8), a  spur going eastbound to connect with the Massachusetts Turnpike, for travelers going either east toward Boston or west toward Albany, New York. North of Springfield, I-91 briefly enters Chicopee where there is an interchange with its spur, I-391, at exit 9 (old exit 12) before turning westward to cross the Connecticut River into West Springfield. I-391 provides direct access to Holyoke, while I-91 continues on the western side of the river.

Just after the river crossing, exit 11 (old exit 14) is a major interchange with the Massachusetts Turnpike (I-90). Then, I-91 enters the city of Holyoke where exit 12 (old exit 15) is located. Just after an interchange with US 202, (exit 16) I-91 goes from three lanes to two lanes in each direction to the Vermont state line. After a short exit-less stretch, I-91 enters Northampton, passing the Northampton Airport and an oxbow lake. The towns of Hadley and Amherst, home to the main campus of the University of Massachusetts Amherst, are accessible from I-91 exits in Northampton via Route 9.

Continuing north, I-91 enters Hatfield, where it begins a straight section—nearly  without a bend in the road. Several exits provide access to US 5 and Route 10 in Hatfield and Whately before entering Deerfield. I-91 has two exits in Greenfield. At exit 43 (old exit 26), the southern end of its overlap with Route 2, there is a rest area and visitor information center for Franklin County. At exit 46 (old exit 27), also in Greenfield, is the northern end of its overlap with Route 2 where access to that road is provided via a directional T interchange and exit and entry ramps on the left side of southbound I-91. Exit 50 (old exit 28) in Bernardston is the last exit in Massachusetts. Beyond exit 50, I-91 continues for about  more before crossing into Vermont.

Vermont 
I-91 travels along the eastern border of Vermont and serves as a major transportation corridor for eastern Vermont and western New Hampshire. Many exits along Vermont's length of I-91 feature New Hampshire towns on the guide signs (for example, exit 3, which lists Brattleboro and Keene, New Hampshire, as the points of access). The highway's rural character and long distances between exits in Vermont are in stark contrast to its south, where exits are more frequent and the road carries four lanes of traffic in each direction at some points. The major control cities in Vermont are Brattleboro, White River Junction, St. Johnsbury, and Newport. When entering northbound I-91 at exit 28 in Derby, the control city sign is for Canada. Of these destinations, only Newport is a city, although the other towns are sizable. In general, the road parallels its predecessor, US 5.

I-91 enters Vermont in the town of Guilford. Just before exit 1 in Brattleboro is the Vermont Welcome Center in Guilford. The first three Vermont exits (northbound) serve the town of Brattleboro. At exit 1, northbound US 5 provides access to stores and a small industrial area before reaching the south end of the town's center, where a bridge crosses the Connecticut River into Hinsdale, New Hampshire, via New Hampshire Route 119 (NH 119). Exit 2 (Vermont Route 9 [VT 9]) provides access to the western village of the town (West Brattleboro), then continues west to Marlboro, Wilmington, and Bennington. Brattleboro's main retail strip is located at and just south of the exit 3 trumpet interchange and traffic circle.

After exit 3, I-91 heads north to travel through the communities of Dummerston, Putney, Westminster, North Westminster, Bellows Falls, Springfield, Weathersfield, Windsor, Hartland, North Hartland and White River Junction. White River Junction, listed as a control city on mileage signs as far south as Greenfield, Massachusetts, is where I-91 and I-89 meet and provide access to many points in Vermont and New Hampshire, at exit 10.

North of the interchange with I-89, I-91 continues toward St. Johnsbury and travels through Wilder and Norwich. It enters Orange County, passing through Thetford, Fairlee, Bradford, Newbury, and Wells River. It continues into the Caledonia County communities of Barnet and Waterford, before coming to its next major intersection in St. Johnsbury at the northern terminus of I-93, providing access to the White Mountains of New Hampshire and the Greater Boston area. Along this stretch of highway between White River Junction and St. Johnsbury, towns in Grafton County, New Hampshire, on the other side of the river can also be easily accessed. Just after exit 19, there are three exits for St. Johnsbury, including a major intersection with US 2. Along westbound US 2, the capital of Vermont, Montpelier, is eventually reached from I-91, although I-89 provides Montpelier with immediate Interstate access.

I-91 continues northward, now following the Passumpsic River valley. It travels through Vermont's Northeast Kingdom region and the town of Lyndon. Two exits in Lyndon serve the village of Lyndonville and Lyndon State College. After exit 24, I-91 departs US 5, which it had been closely paralleling since the Massachusetts state line. I-91 follows the valley of Miller Run, and there are no convenient services until Barton at exit 25.

The Interstate proceeds through Sheffield. Here, it reaches the highest point on the road, just north of milemarker 150 on Sheffield Heights, elevation .

After leaving Sheffield Heights, it enters Orleans County and follows the Barton River valley north with exits in Barton, Orleans, and Derby. Exit 29 is the final US exit on I-91 just after milemarker 177 at Derby Line. Beyond the exit ramp, northbound motorists enter Canada Customs at Stanstead, Quebec, and continue into Canada on Quebec Autoroute 55 through the Eastern Townships.

As with Connecticut and Massachusetts, US 5 closely parallels I-91 for their entire lengths in Vermont. While paralleling I-91 in Vermont, US 5 is never concurrent with the freeway but remains its own two-lane road, except for a portion in White River Junction where it is a four-lane divided surface arterial.

Traffic and the population of each successive town tend to diminish as the road proceeds northward. The average daily traffic count for 2015 in Vermont were—St. Johnsbury (34,000), Lyndon (17,900), Barton (13,500), and Derby (Canadian border) (10,300).

History 

A limited-access highway replacement for US 5 was planned at the federal level starting in 1944. A 1953 Massachusetts plan was funded by the Federal-Aid Highway Act of 1956, along with spur I-291 (but not I-391). The Vermont section of I-91 was built in stages from 1958 to 1965. In Massachusetts from Bernardston to Northampton, I-91 follows an abandoned right-of-way of the New York, New Haven and Hartford Railroad. To support plans for urban renewal along the "low value" waterfront, the highway crossed the Connecticut River to parallel active New York, New Haven and Hartford Railroad tracks on the Springfield side of the river, bypassing West Springfield and Agawam, Massachusetts. Later, this path was perceived as cutting off the city from the river, restricting further commercial development. By 1960, a few miles in Massachusetts were completed, starting from the Connecticut and Vermont state lines. Massachusetts construction was completed from 1960s to 1970.

In the 1950s–1970s, there were plans to extend I-91 to Wading River, New York, from its existing terminus in New Haven, Connecticut, via a crossing of the Long Island Sound (see "Unbuilt Long Island extension" below). Vermont completed its last sections of I-91 in 1978.

Starting in the 1990s, several rest areas were downgraded in Vermont, increasing distances between facilities. In 2008, Vermont closed the Springfield–Rockingham rest areas because of suspected use by drug abusers. In 2009, the northbound rest area in Hartford was closed, creating a  gap in on-highway facilities. At the present time, there exist two intermediate rest areas with facilities in each direction, in addition to a welcome center at each end of the state. Several parking areas remain open.

In the early 1990s after the I-284 project was canceled, the exit 44 interchange in East Windsor, Connecticut, was altered as it was designed to be part of the freeway. After alterations, exit 44 connected to US 5 for all traffic to get on and off. As a result, exit 43 was shut down and closed in that same time frame.

In 2005, the Massachusetts Highway Department completed a rebuild of on- and offramps in Springfield to reduce accidents caused by weaving near the tightly spaced exits.

Impact in Springfield 

During its construction in the 1960s, I-91 sliced through three Springfield neighborhoods: the North End, Metro Center, and South End, which led to urban decay in the highway's vicinity. Despite being widely regarded as positive progress at the time it was built, by 2011, Springfield's portion of I-91 was perceived as disrupting the urban fabric of each riverfront neighborhood, while, in effect, amputating everything east of the highway—the majority of the city—from the Connecticut River, the Connecticut River Walk Park, and the Naismith Memorial Basketball Hall of Fame. However, I-91 was erected without tunnels, footbridges, and other paths leading to the riverfront, and thus continues to pose logistical problems for people getting to the riverfront, which, in turn, poses problems for businesses that would like to set up along Springfield's riverfront. The placement of I-91 has left Springfield's riverfront virtually undeveloped aside from the sliver of land surrounding the Basketball Hall of Fame.

In 2010, the Urban Land Institute made recommendations for how Springfield might reconnect with its riverfront, in order to revitalize the area through urban renewal, suggesting the most cost-effective but also the most development-limiting strategy (constructing pathways beneath I-91). No decision has been reached regarding those recommendations. , academic and civic studies are still underway. Preliminary findings indicate that I-91's placement negatively impacts tourism in Springfield's Metro Center—the site of many of Springfield's historic, cultural, and entertainment venues. Springfield's most popular tourist attraction, the riverfront Basketball Hall of Fame, is separated from Metro Center by a  stone wall, buttressing an elevated portion of the six-lane I-91 and greatly discouraging travel between the two areas. Academic suggestions that involve the demolition of the current highway and moving it to a less obtrusive site in the city have been proposed, including the demolition of the highway and following the original path suggested, Riverdale Road, and, least obtrusive but still requiring a great deal of work, a plan to construct numerous walkways beneath the elevated highway to better integrate the neighborhoods with the waterfront despite the highway's presence.

Unbuilt Long Island extension 

Between the 1950s and 1970s, officials proposed extending I-91 across the Long Island Sound from its current terminus at the I-91/I-95 interchange in New Haven, Connecticut, to Wading River, New York, by means of a bridge over the Long Island Sound, as one of the many Long Island Sound Link proposals. The extension would have continued southward from Wading River to the southern shore of Long Island by the existing County Route 46 (William Floyd Parkway) in central Suffolk County—which would have been updated to Interstate Highway standards. It would also provide easier access to New York City via the Long Island Expressway (I-495), as well as to the Hamptons via New York State Route 27 (Sunrise Highway). The various proposals for this never-built extension were ultimately dropped after a 1979 study of the concept. Following this, officials proposed to connect the New Haven and Shoreham–Wading River areas by means of ferry service across the Long Island Sound—however, the plans to implement these cross-sound ferry services were ultimately mothballed, as well.

Despite the cancelation of the bridge, many Long Islanders are still in favor of building one. In 2000, a survey was conducted by News 12 Networks and Newsday, which found that the majority (63 percent) of Long Islanders were in support of such a project.

In 2016, the proposal was again renewed by New York Governor Andrew Cuomo, as either a bridge or a tunnel. However, these plans were also dropped, as announced by the New York State Department of Transportation in 2018.

Exit list 
All interchanges in Massachusetts were to be renumbered to milepost-based numbers under a project scheduled to start in 2016. However, this project was indefinitely postponed until November 18, 2019, when the Massachusetts Department of Transportation (MassDOT) confirmed that, beginning in the middle of 2020, the exit renumbering project will begin. On March 1, 2021, MassDOT confirmed that the exit renumbering on I-91 will start on March 3, and it will last for two weeks. In 2020, Vermont added "milepoint exit" numbers to existing signs, essentially marking each interchange with two exit numbers.

See also

Explanatory notes

References

External links 

 I-91 historical overview from bostonroads.com

 
91
91
91
91
Transportation in Hartford, Connecticut
Transportation in New Haven, Connecticut
Transportation in New Haven County, Connecticut
Transportation in Middlesex County, Connecticut
Transportation in Hartford County, Connecticut
Transportation in Hampden County, Massachusetts
Transportation in Hampshire County, Massachusetts
Transportation in Franklin County, Massachusetts
Transportation in Windham County, Vermont
Transportation in Windsor County, Vermont
Transportation in Orange County, Vermont
Transportation in Caledonia County, Vermont
Transportation in Orleans County, Vermont
U.S. Route 5